A list of films produced by the Tollywood (Bengali language film industry) based in Kolkata in the year 1963.

A-Z of films

References

External links
 Tollywood films of 1963 at the Internet Movie Database

1963
Lists of 1963 films by country or language
Films, Bengali